This is a sub-article to History of Białystok
The following is a timeline of the history of the city of Białystok, Poland.

Prior to 19th century

 1320 - Settlement founded in Lithuania.
 1569 – part of the Lesser Poland Province of the Crown of the Kingdom of Poland
 1692 – Białystok granted city rights by Polish King John III Sobieski
 1697 - Branicki Palace built.
 1745 – the first military technical school in Poland founded in Białystok
 1748 – one of the oldest theaters in Poland, the Komedialnia, founded
 1749 – King Augustus III of Poland extended the city limits
 1753 - Center of the city burns down
 1756 - Jan Klemens Branicki, owner of Białystok, divorces his third wife
 1763–1768 – Municipal hospital founded by Jan Klemens Branicki.
 13 July 1769 – , part of the War of the Bar Confederation
 1770 – midwifery school founded under the auspices of Izabella Poniatowska
 9 October 1771 – Jan Klemens Branicki dies
 1789 – the epidemic of smallpox, the 22 children died
 1795 – City annexed by Prussia in the Third Partition of Poland and made the administrative seat of the Białystok Department
 26 January 1796 – Prussian administration takes over the town, but it remains formally owned by Izabella Poniatowska-Branicka

19th century
 1805 – Institute of Obstetrics established based on the midwifery school
 1807 - Town becomes part of Russia, per Peace of Tilsit; and capital of the Belostok Oblast.
 14 February 1808 – Izabella Poniatowska-Branicka dies
 3 July 1812 – Napoleon's army enters the city,
 13 July 1812 – Declaration of the inhabitants of communication with the Commonwealth,
 4 August 1812 – Russian army enters the city
 8 August 1812 – giving a new coat of the city by Tsar Alexander I
 13 December 1830 – announcement of martial law by the Russian authorities in connection with the outbreak of the November Uprising,
 1 February 1831 – setting up headquarters in the Russian army commander, Field Marshal Hans Karl von Diebitsch, whose task was to suppress the November Uprising
 1834 – a ban on teaching in schools in the Polish language
 1842 - City becomes administratively part of the Grodno Governorate.
 1845 - Woollen mill built.
 1857 - Population: 13,787.
 15 December 1859 – Ludwik Zamenhof, the creator of the international language Esperanto, was born
 13 June 1860 – the beginning of a patriotic demonstration under the banner of national unity and fight against colonization,
 1861
 16 March: Prayers were held by local Poles and Jews in memory of Polish protesters massacred by the Russians in Warsaw a few weeks earlier. 
 3 May: The Russians arrested several Polish students during the celebration of the Polish 3 May Constitution Day.
 9 June: Andrzej Artur Zamoyski, representative of the Whites, arrives in the city
 1862 – Opening of the Saint Petersburg–Warsaw Railway through the city
 24 April 1863 – the beginning of the Polish January Uprising in the Białystok area
 15 February 1864 - Battle of the January Uprising was fought near Białystok.
 1877 – expanding the city limits: integrated railway station, the village of Piaski and Las Zwierzyniecki
 1886 – the railway line Bialystok – Vawkavysk – Baranovichi
 1889 - Population: 56,629.
 1891 – Launch of the first telephone exchange
 1895 – launch of three lines of horse tram
 1897 - Population: 63,927.
 1898 – establishment of the Volunteer Fire Department

20th century

1901–1939

 1901 - Population: 65,781.
 1905 - Chernoe Znamia political group formed.
 1906 - 14–16 June: Białystok pogrom of Jews by the Russians.
 1910 - Białystok Power Station commissioned.
 1912
 Tsarist prison built. 
 Population: 98,170.
 1913 - Great Synagogue built.
 1915 - City becomes capital of the Bialystok-Grodno District of the German-controlled territory of Ober-Ost during World War I.
 1919
 Białystok part of the re-established Polish state, capital of the Białystok Voivodeship
 Białostoczek becomes part of city.
 1920
 22 September: Battle of Białystok - Polish victory over the invading Russian forces.
 Jagiellonia Białystok football club formed.

 1921 - Białystok confirmed as part of Poland.
 1928 - Polmos Białystok founded.
 1934 - Seweryn Nowakowski, considered one of the greatest mayors of Białystok, becomes mayor.
 1937
 Podlaska Cavalry Brigade of the Polish Army formed and stationed in Białystok.
 Population: 100,101.
 1938 - Białystok Municipal Theatre built.

World War II (1939–1945)
 1939
 September: German occupation after the invasion of Poland, which started World War II
 20–21 September: The German Einsatzgruppe IV entered the city to commit crimes against the population.
 22 September: City handed over by the Germans to the Soviet Union in accordance with the Molotov–Ribbentrop Pact. Soviet occupation begins.
 October: Pre-war mayor Seweryn Nowakowski arrested by the NKVD and probably deported to the USSR; his fate remains unknown.
 November: City annexed to the Byelorussian Soviet Socialist Republic; and capital of the Belastok Voblast.
 1940 - 17 July: Ryszard Kaczorowski, member of the local Polish resistance movement and future President of Poland in exile, arrested by the NKVD.
 1940–1941 - Mass deportations of some 20,000 Polish citizens by the Russians from the Białystok Fabryczny railway station to the USSR, incl. Siberia (see Soviet repressions of Polish citizens (1939–1946)).
 1941
 27 June: City occupation by German forces begins.
 City becomes capital of Bezirk Białystok.
 July: Jewish ghetto established by occupying Nazi Germans.
 1942 - 2 November: The Germans established a forced labour camp for Jewish men.
 1943
 February: The German Sicherheitspolizei begins deporations of Poles including teenage boys from the local Nazi prison to the Stutthof concentration camp.
 16 August: Białystok Ghetto Uprising.

 1944
 July: occupied by the Soviets
 mass arrests of Polish resistance members by the Soviets, around 1,200 Poles placed in the local prison by 7 November.
 September: the city returned to Poland, although with a Soviet-installed communist regime, capital of the part of the Białystok Voivodeship
 8 November: deportation of 1,030 arrested Poles by the Russians from the local prison to Ostashkov.
 12 November: deportation of 1,014 arrested Poles by the Russians from the local prison to Ostashkov.
 24 November: deportation of 900 arrested Poles by the Russians from the local prison to Ostashkov.
 27 December: deportation of 790 arrested Poles by the Russians from the local prison to Novomoskovsk (then Stalinogorsk).
 1945 - 30 January: deportation of 1,242 arrested Poles by the Russians from the local prison to Skopin.

1945–2000
 1946 - Population: 56,759.
 1948 - Hetman Białystok football club formed.
 1949 -  founded.
 1950 - Medical University of Białystok established.
 1951 - Gazeta Współczesna newspaper begins publication.
 1953 - Białystok Puppet Theatre established.
 1956 - Manifestation of support for the Hungarian Revolution of 1956. Mass raising of funds, food, medical supplies and blood donation for Hungarian insurgents (see also Hungary–Poland relations).
 1960 -  established.
 1972 - Białystok City Stadium opens.

 1974
 Białystok University of Technology active.
 Population: 187,100.
 1975 - City becomes capital of the Białystok Voivodeship (1975–98).
 1990
  founded.
  becomes mayor.
  installed at Kościuszko Square.
 1991 - Roman Catholic Diocese of Białystok established.
 1992 – Roman Catholic Diocese of Białystok elevated to Archdiocese.
 1998 - Population: 283,937 (estimate).
 1999 - City becomes capital of the Podlaskie Voivodeship.

21st century

 2004 - City divided into 27 administrative districts.
 2006 - Tadeusz Truskolaski becomes mayor.
 2008 - Jewish Heritage Trail in Białystok created.
 2009
 Zamenhof Centre opens.
 World Congress of Esperanto held in city.
 2012 - Population: 294,900.
 2018
 1 March: Danuta Siedzikówna monument unveiled.
 11 April: Monument to the victims of Soviet deportations of Poles during World War II unveiled at the Białystok Fabryczny railway station.
 2020 - Monument to Polish mothers deported to Siberia unveiled.
 2022 - Monument to soldiers of the pre-war Polish 42nd Infantry Regiment-footballers of Jagiellonia Białystok unveiled in front of the municipal stadium.

See also
 History of Białystok
 Other names of Białystok, e.g. Belostok, Bielostok, Byelostok

References
This article incorporates information from the Polish Wikipedia.

Bibliography

External links

 Map of Bialystok, 1967 (via Digital Public Library of America)

 
Bialystok
Bialystok
Years in Poland